Devils Head is a mountain summit in the Rampart Range of the Rocky Mountains of Colorado.

Mountain
Devils Head is topped by the Devil's Head Lookout, an active United States Forest Service fire lookout tower.  Access to the summit and lookout tower is via the Devils Head National Recreation Trail.

Devils Head name comes from prospectors of the late 1800s.  From the southwest of Devils Head, and looking northeast toward the mountain, one can see a shape of a face laying flat, as if the mountain was looking up. Some of the forest has softened the looks, as there used to be a more obvious eye socket, and facial features.  However, from this angle, one is still able to see the face and even horns.

Historical names
The Sleeping Indian
Camels Back
Devils Head – 1923 
Platte Mountain
Warrens Crag

See also

List of Colorado mountain ranges
List of Colorado mountain summits
List of Colorado fourteeners
List of Colorado 4000 meter prominent summits
List of the most prominent summits of Colorado
List of Colorado county high points

References

External links

Devil's Head Trailhead #611 (Devil's Head National Recreation Trail) on Pike National Forest Website
Devils Head on listsofjohn.org
Devils Head on peakery.com
Devils Head on summitpost.org

Mountains of Colorado
Mountains of Douglas County, Colorado
Pike National Forest
North American 2000 m summits